The Manchurian wapiti (Cervus canadensis xanthopygus) is a subspecies of the wapiti native to East Asia.

Description

The Manchurian wapiti's coat is reddish brown during summer, and brownish gray in winter. It has dark hairs on the neck and dark underparts, followed by a light-colored rump patch. It is smaller than North American elk (Cervus canadensis canadensis) with smaller and stouter antlers.

Male deer are wapiti-like with a neck mane, and as mentioned, relatively small wapiti-like antlers.  Female deer are more red deer-like and lack neck manes.  This deer is the most red deer-like of the wapiti, being adapted to mixed deciduous forest environments in Manchuria, Yakutia, Northern China and North Korea.  Like many red deer, adult deer may have some visible spots in their summer coats.

Cows weigh  and bulls weigh , and bulls attain measurements of 1.5m in height and 2.4m in length.

Range

This deer is found in southeastern Siberia (to the east of Lake Baikal), northeastern Mongolia, Manchuria, North Korea and northeastern China.  
Similar forms from Alxa, Gansu, Shanxi and southern Mongolia were originally described as a distinct subspecies, the Alashan wapiti (Cervus canadensis alashanicus). However recent genetic research indicates that this deer belongs to the Manchurian subspecies.

References

Elk and red deer
Mammals of Siberia
Mammals of Korea
Mammals of China
Mammals of Mongolia